The Clarksville Metropolitan Statistical Area is defined by the United States Census Bureau as an area consisting of four counties – two (Montgomery and Stewart) in Tennessee and two (Christian and Trigg) in Kentucky – anchored by the city of Clarksville, Tennessee. The 2021 estimate placed the population at 329,864. As of 2020, the Clarksville Metropolitan Statistical Area is the 159th largest MSA in the United States.

Prior to 2003, the area was officially known as the Clarksville-Hopkinsville Metropolitan Statistical Area and included only Montgomery and Christian counties.  In 2003, Hopkinsville was removed from the official name as it was no longer considered a principal city. That year, Stewart and Trigg counties were also added to the MSA.

Counties
Montgomery County, Tennessee
Stewart County, Tennessee
Christian County, Kentucky
Trigg County, Kentucky

Communities

Places with more than 100,000 inhabitants
Clarksville, Tennessee (Principal city)

Places with 25,000 to 50,000 inhabitants
Hopkinsville, Kentucky

Places with 5,000 to 25,000 inhabitants
Fort Campbell North, Kentucky (census-designated place)
Oak Grove, Kentucky

Places with 1,000 to 5,000 inhabitants
Cadiz, Kentucky
Dover, Tennessee
Tennessee Ridge, Tennessee (partial)

Places with fewer than 1,000 inhabitants
Crofton, Kentucky
Cumberland City, Tennessee
LaFayette, Kentucky
Pembroke, Kentucky

Unincorporated places
Bumpus Mills, Tennessee
Canton, Kentucky
Cerulean, Kentucky
Cunningham, Tennessee
Dotsonville, Tennessee
Excell, Tennessee
Fairview, Christian County, Kentucky
Fearsville, Kentucky
Fredonia, Tennessee
Gracey, Kentucky
Herndon, Kentucky
Kelly, Kentucky
Needmore, Tennessee
Oakridge, Tennessee
Oakwood, Tennessee
Orgains Crossroads, Tennessee
Palmyra, Tennessee
Port Royal, Tennessee
Rockcastle, Kentucky
Rossview, Tennessee
Sango, Tennessee
Southside, Tennessee
Shiloh, Montgomery County, Tennessee
Sailors Rest, Tennessee
Tarsus, Tennessee
Wallonia, Kentucky
Woodlawn, Tennessee

Demographics
As of the census of 2000, there were 232,000 people, 83,332 households, and 61,719 families residing within the MSA. The racial makeup of the MSA was 74.16% White, 19.13% African American, 0.51% Native American, 1.43% Asian, 0.23% Pacific Islander, 1.98% from other races, and 2.55% from two or more races. Hispanic or Latino of any race were 4.61% of the population.

The median income for a household in the MSA was $33,869, and the median income for a family was $39,451. Males had a median income of $29,506 versus $21,849 for females. The per capita income for the MSA was $16,341.

See also
Tennessee census statistical areas
Kentucky census statistical areas

References

External links
City of Clarksville, Tennessee – Official site.
Census.gov 1990–2000 Comparison Chart PDF